End of the Rainbow is a 1930 German musical film directed by Max Reichmann and starring Richard Tauber, Lucie Englisch and Sophie Pagay.

The film's sets were designed by Hans Jacoby.

Cast
 Richard Tauber as Toni Lechner
 Maria Elsner as Cora Garden
 Sophie Pagay as Mutter Lechner
 Lucie Englisch as Leni
 Oskar Sima as Loisl
 Karl Elzer as Mannheimer - Manager
 Edith Karin
 Toni Tetzlaff
 Julius Falkenstein
 Karl Platen
 Karl Etlinger
 Gerhard Ritterband
 Fritz Rotter as Schlagerkomponist

References

Bibliography

External links 
 

1930 films
1930 musical films
Films of the Weimar Republic
German musical films
1930s German-language films
Films directed by Max Reichmann
Bavaria Film films
Films scored by Paul Dessau
German black-and-white films
1930s German films